Stop! Luke! Listen! is a 1917 short comedy film featuring Harold Lloyd.

Cast
 Harold Lloyd as Lonesome Luke
 Bebe Daniels 
 Snub Pollard 
 Bud Jamison
 Sammy Brooks
 W.L. Adams
 David Voorhees
 Charles Stevenson (as Charles E. Stevenson)
 Arthur Harrison
 Gilbert Pratt
 Max Hamburger
 Gus Leonard
 Clara Dray
 Elmer Ballard
 May Ballard
 Loretta Morelaw
 Billy Fay
 Sandy Roth
 Margaret Joslin (as Margaret Joslin Todd)
 Marie Mosquini
 Art Bass

See also
 Harold Lloyd filmography

References

External links

1917 films
American silent short films
1917 comedy films
1917 short films
American black-and-white films
Films directed by Hal Roach
Silent American comedy films
Lonesome Luke films
American comedy short films
1910s American films